Pectis ciliaris, the donkeyweed, is a species of Pectis and is an annual plant. Its floral region is the Caribbean, mainly Puerto Rico.

External links
 

ciliaris
Flora of North America
Plants described in 1759